KIMA-TV (channel 29) is a television station in Yakima, Washington, United States, affiliated with CBS and The CW Plus. It is owned by Sinclair Broadcast Group alongside low-power, Class A Univision affiliate KUNW-CD (channel 2). Both stations share studios on Terrace Heights Boulevard (east of I-82) in Yakima, while KIMA-TV's transmitter is located on Ahtanum Ridge.

KIMA operates two semi-satellites–KEPR-TV (channel 19) in Pasco (serving the Tri-Cities) and KLEW-TV (channel 3) in Lewiston, Idaho. They simulcast all network and syndicated programming as provided through KIMA, but air separate commercial inserts, legal identifications and early evening newscasts, and have their own websites. Master control and some internal operations for the four stations are based at KOMO Plaza (formerly Fisher Plaza) in Seattle.

On satellite, Dish Network and DirecTV carry both KIMA-TV and KEPR-TV.

History
KIMA signed on July 19, 1953 as the 200th television station in the United States and the first in central Washington. The station was originally owned by Cascade Broadcasting Company along with KIMA radio (AM 1460, now KUTI). It carried programming from all four networks–CBS, NBC, ABC and DuMont–but has always been a primary CBS affiliate.

It lost DuMont when that network shut down in 1955, then lost ABC when KNDO signed on in 1959 as a primary ABC affiliate. When KNDO switched affiliations to NBC in 1965, the two stations shared ABC until 1970, when KAPP signed on and took over ABC, leaving KIMA to become a full-time CBS affiliate.

Just before KIMA signed on, the Federal Communications Commission (FCC) collapsed all of central Washington–including the Tri-Cities–into one giant television market. It soon became apparent that channel 29 was not nearly strong enough to cover this vast and mountainous area by itself. With this in mind, in 1954 Cascade signed on KEPR-TV as the first satellite station in the United States. It was originally intended to be a full repeater of KIMA-TV, but due to popular demand it became more of a local station.

At one point, KIMA also had a satellite station in Ephrata, Washington. KBAS-TV signed on the air February 15, 1957 on channel 43; it moved to channel 16 in 1958. KBAS was owned by Basin TV Company, a subsidiary of Cascade Broadcasting, and this was reflected in its call letters. KBAS shut down on November 30, 1961.

Filmways agreed to purchase Cascade Broadcasting for $3 million in 1968; the sale was approved the following year. Cascade's previous owners retained the company's radio stations, which by this point also included the construction permit for KIMA-FM (107.3 FM, now KFFM), under the name Yakima Valley Communications. Filmways sold KIMA-TV, KEPR-TV, and KLEW-TV to NWG Broadcasting for $1 million in 1972. Retlaw Enterprises acquired the NWG stations for $17 million in 1986; the stations were operated as part of the Retlaw Broadcasting division.  Fisher Communications purchased the Retlaw owned stations in 1999.

On March 29, 2009, KIMA launched a digital subchannel affiliated with The CW to fill the void left by KCWK (channel 9) going dark at the end of May 2008 due to the Pappas Telecasting bankruptcy. The new channel took KCWK's former Channel 9 position on local cable systems and carries the CW Plus schedule.

On April 11, 2013, Fisher announced that it would sell its properties, including KIMA-TV, to the Sinclair Broadcast Group. The deal was completed on August 8, 2013.

Programming
Current syndicated programs on KIMA include Dr. Phil, Judge Judy, The Big Bang Theory, and The Simpsons, which has aired at 7:30 p.m. a majority of the time since it went into syndication in the fall of 1994.

News operation
KIMA offers the only local Yakima-focused newscast with a fully operational newsroom in Yakima weekdays on KIMA Action News at 5 and 6 p.m. KIMA's morning, 10 p.m. (on CW), 11 p.m. and weekend newscasts are shared with KEPR. There are no noon newscasts unlike most CBS affiliates. Branded as KIMA/KEPR Action News, they cover both the Yakima Valley and the Columbia Basin. Weather segments for KIMA's evening newscasts are pre-taped at KEPR.

Technical information

Subchannels
The station's digital signal is multiplexed:

Translator

See also
Channel 9 branded TV stations in the United States
Channel 29 virtual TV stations in the United States
Channel 33 digital TV stations in the United States

References

External links

Yakima/Tri-Cities CW 9

CBS network affiliates
TBD (TV network) affiliates
Television channels and stations established in 1953
1953 establishments in Washington (state)
IMA-TV
Mass media in Yakima, Washington
Sinclair Broadcast Group